The phrase "T distribution" may refer to
 Student's t-distribution in univariate probability theory, 
 Hotelling's T-square distribution in multivariate statistics. 
 Multivariate Student distribution.